Constance II may refer to:

 Anna of Hohenstaufen (1230–1307), Empress Consort of Nicaea (ca. 1241–1254), sometimes referred to as Constance II of Hohenstaufen
 Constance of Sicily, Queen of Aragon, who disputedly ruled the Kingdom of Sicily as Constance II
 , later USS YP-633, a United States Navy patrol boat in commission from 1917 to 1922